Harry Hall (1893 – after 1926) was an English footballer who played in the Football League for both Sheffield United and Sheffield Wednesday. He also had spells at Lincoln City and numerous other clubs in the Lincolnshire area. He was born in Newark-on-Trent, Nottinghamshire.

References

1893 births
Year of death missing
Sportspeople from Newark-on-Trent
Footballers from Nottinghamshire
English footballers
Association football forwards
Gainsborough Trinity F.C. players
Newark F.C. players
Long Eaton Rangers F.C. players
Long Eaton St Helens F.C. players
Sheffield United F.C. players
Worksop Town F.C. players
Ilkeston United F.C. players
Sheffield Wednesday F.C. players
Lincoln City F.C. players
Newark Town F.C. players
Grantham Town F.C. players
Ransome & Marles F.C. players
English Football League players